Courtney William Ireland is a New Zealand athlete specialising in the shot put.

He competed in the Commonwealth Games in 1990, and in 1994 when he won silver. In 1990, he was awarded the New Zealand 1990 Commemoration Medal.

He was in the USA on a scholarship 1991–94, and later played rugby in Japan for Coca-Cola.

References 

Athletes at the Games by John Clark, page 58 (1998, Athletics New Zealand)   
Profile at NZOGC website

Athletes (track and field) at the 1990 Commonwealth Games
Athletes (track and field) at the 1994 Commonwealth Games
Commonwealth Games silver medallists for New Zealand
New Zealand male shot putters
Living people
Coca-Cola Red Sparks players
New Zealand rugby union players
Commonwealth Games medallists in athletics
Year of birth missing (living people)
Medallists at the 1994 Commonwealth Games